Ramji Ladha Nakum  (10 February 1900 – 20 December 1948) was an Indian Test cricketer who played his solitary test in 1933.

Cricket career

Ramji was a fast bowler. In a first-class match in 1931-32 he took 8 for 14 and 4 for 32 for Freelooters against Nizam's State Railway A. His brother Amar Singh took the other eight wickets.

References

External links

India Test cricketers
Indian cricketers
Hindus cricketers
Patiala cricketers
Rajasthan cricketers
Western India cricketers
1900 births
1948 deaths
Cricketers from Gujarat